Sikui (also Romanized as Sīkū’ī; also known as Sikooh) is a village in Byaban Rural District, Byaban District, Minab County, Hormozgan Province, Iran. At the 2006 census, its population was 427, in 71 families.

References 

Populated places in Minab County